Emanuel Oletu or Emmanuel Oletu (born 8 December 1983) is a Nigerian football defender playing with Austrian side SC Hainfeld.

Career
Born in Lagos. In summer 2003 he moved to Austria. After several seasons there, playing for SV Kapfenberg, SV Donau and SC Eisenstadt, Oletu moved, in 2008, to Serbia to play in the historic FK Spartak Subotica, nowadays known by the sponsor name of Spartak Zlatibor Voda. After a successful first season where he was the pillar of the team's defence, the club gained promotion to the Serbian SuperLiga in 2009. In summer 2010 he left, having played his last match with Spartak at the qualifying round 2 of the 2010–11 UEFA Europa League game against FC Differdange 03.

In 2011, he moved back to Austria joining Austrian Regional League East side SC Columbia Floridsdorf.  In summer 2012 he moved to same level club 1. Simmeringer SC. and during the winter break of the 2012–13 season he moved to SC Ostbahn XI.

References

External sources
 Emanuel Oletu at Srbijafudbal
 Emanuel Oletu at Prva Liga Srbije

Living people
1983 births
Sportspeople from Lagos
Nigerian footballers
Nigerian expatriate footballers
Association football defenders
Kwara United F.C. players
Kapfenberger SV players
SC Eisenstadt players
SC Ostbahn XI players
Expatriate footballers in Austria
Nigerian expatriate sportspeople in Austria
FC Senec players
Slovak Super Liga players
Expatriate footballers in Slovakia
Nigerian expatriate sportspeople in Slovakia
FK Spartak Subotica players
Serbian SuperLiga players
Expatriate footballers in Serbia
Nigerian expatriate sportspeople in Serbia
Naturalized citizens of Slovakia